Taniwhasaurus ("taniwha lizard") is an extinct genus of mosasaurs (a group of extinct marine lizards) who lived during the Late Cretaceous in what is now New Zealand and Antarctica, possibly even in other continents. The genus belongs to the subfamily Tylosaurinae, a lineage of mosasaurs characterized by a long toothless conical rostrum.

Although the fossils assigned to the genus are incomplete and mainly known from cranial material, the morphology of Taniwhasaurus is overall typical of tylosaurines. The rare fossils of the axial skeleton indicate that the animal would have had great mobility in the vertebral column, but the tail would generate the main propulsive movement, a method of swimming proposed for other mosasaurids. The constitution of the paddle-like forelimb in Taniwhasaurus indicates that it would have had powerful paddles for swimming. CT scans performed on the snout foramina of T. antarcticus show that Taniwhasaurus, like various aquatic predators today, would likely have had an electro-sensitive organ capable of detecting the movements of prey underwater.

The taxonomic history of Taniwhasaurus is complex, with several species having been described from very fragmentary fossils to be considered viable. Nonetheless, a phylogenetic review of tylosaurines published in 2019 confirms that at least two species, T. oweni and T. antarcticus, belong to the genus, with the two other indeterminate species being undiagnostic to be considered as separate species.

Search history

Recognized species

T. oweni

The first known species, Taniwhasaurus oweni, was discovered in the 1860s in the Conway Formation, located in the cliffs of Haumuri Bluff, eastern New Zealand. This formation is dated from the Upper Cretaceous, more precisely from the lower and middle Campanian stage. The first fossils formally attributed to this taxa were described by the Scottish naturalist James Hector in 1874. The skeletal material of T. oweni consisted of a skull, vertebrae and paddles, divided into three distinct sections. In 1888, noting that the fossils are incomplete, Richard Lydekker uncertainly places T. oweni within the genus Platecarpus, being renamed Platecarpus oweni. In 1897, in his revision of the distribution of mosasaurs, Samuel Wendell Williston put Taniwhasaurus back as a separate genus, but considered it to still be close to Platecarpus. As Hector did not designate a holotype fossil for this taxa, Samuel Paul Welles and D. R. Gregg designate specimen NMNZ R1536, a fragmented skull consisting of frontal and parietal bone accompanied by partial dentary bone, as the lectotype of T. oweni in 1971. The genus name Taniwhasaurus is made up of the Māori word Taniwha, and the Ancient Greek word σαῦρος (saûros, "lizard"), all literally meaning "lizard of Taniwha", in reference to a supernatural aquatic creature from Māori mythology. The specific epithet oweni is named in honor of the famous English paleontologist Richard Owen, who was the first to describe the Mesozoic marine reptiles of New Zealand.

In his article, Hector describes several skeletal remains which he attributes to another mosasaur, which he names Leiodon haumuriensis. In 1897, Williston suggested to transfer this taxon within the genus Tylosaurus, a proposal that will be carried out in 1971, being renamed  Tylosaurus haumuriensis. Welles and Gregg also refer to specimen NMNZ R1532 as the lectotype of Tylosaurus haumuriensis in the article. In 1999, new cranial and postcranial material was discovered in the cliffs of Haumuri Bluff and these findings were formalized by Michael W. Caldwell and his colleagues in 2005. Based on extensive analyzes of these fossils, researchers find that there are in fact few morphological differences between the two mosasaur taxa from this locality, the differences being mainly due to the larger size of specimen NMNZ R1532, making Tylosaurus haumuriensis a junior synonym of T. oweni.

T. antarcticus
In 2002, a new mosasaurid taxon was identified from fossils discovered in the Gamma Member of the Snow Hill Island Formation, located on James Ross Island in Antarctica. The formation is dated to the Santonian-Campanian stages of the Late Cretaceous, a similar dating to that of the New Zealand Conway Formation. This discovery concerns a tylosaurine specimen, cataloged IAA 2000-JR-FSM-1, containing a skull, a tooth, some vertebrae and rib fragments. After analyzing the material, Fernando E. Novas and his colleagues named it Lakumasaurus antarcticus. The genus name Lakumasaurus comes from the Lakuma, a sea spirit from the mythology of the Yahgan people, and from the Ancient Greek term σαῦρος (saûros, "lizard"), to literally give "lizard of Lakuma". The specific epithet antarcticus refers to Antarctica, where the animal lived.

In 2007, James E. Martin and Marta Fernández questioned the validity of Lakumasaurus as a separate genus, noting that the cranial features are minute enough to justify such a proposal. However, they state that there are enough differences to classify Lakumasaurus antarcticus as the second species in the genus Taniwhasaurus, being renamed T. antarcticus. The same year, Martin and his colleagues announced the discovery of a juvenile skull considered to belong to the same species and dating from the Maastrichtian, however, later studies are skeptical of this claim. Less than two years later, in 2009, the same authors published an article that described the phylogenetic relationships between the species T. antarcticus and T. oweni, a relationship that happens to be still recognized today.

Uncertain species

T. capensis
At the beginning of the 20th century, several fossils began to be collected in the region of Pondoland, in South Africa. These fossils turn out to belong to squamates and sea turtles dating from the Santonian stage of the Upper Cretaceous. In 1901, one of the fossils discovered, being a few fragmentary pieces of a jawbone, was referenced as belonging to a reptile considered close to the genus Mosasaurus. This collection of fossils was later given to the Scottish paleontologist Robert Broom, who published in 1912 an article describing the same bones, along with a vertebra attributed to this specimen. He concludes that the fossils would belong to a large South African representative of the genus Tylosaurus, naming it Tylosaurus capensis.

Throughout the remainder of the 20th century, Tylosaurus capensis was generally viewed as a valid species within the genus, being identified primarily by the size of the parietal foramen and the suture between the frontal and parietal bones. However, both characteristics are highly variable within the genus Tylosaurus and are not considered diagnostic at the species level. In 2019, the re-examination of tylosaurines conducted by Paulina Jimenez-Huidobro and Caldwell found that the holotype specimen, cataloged SAM-PK-5265, was more characteristic of Taniwhasaurus than Tylosaurus, but also found that the fossils were too poorly preserved to identify definitively to genus. Nevertheless, the study moves the taxon Tylosaurus capensis to Taniwhasaurus. In 2022, an anatomical review of South African mosasaurs approximates the specimen to T. mikasaensis based on dental scans and considers it to belong to the genus, although the authors still claim the differences are too slight to justify a new species.

T. mikasaensis
In June 1976, a large front part of a mosasaur skull was discovered on a bank of the Ikushumbetsu River in Hokkaidō, Japan. This specimen was found in a floating concretion, and its formation of origin was identified with the Kashima Formation, in the Yezo Group, the locality being the exposed area of this same place. Like the previously mentioned sites, the formation from which the animal was found is dated to the Santonian-Campanian stage. The specimen, cataloged MCM.M0009, was named Yezosaurus mikasaensis in a press release issued by K. Muramoto and Ikuwo Obata on November 30 1976, before being erroneously classified as a tyrannosauroid dinosaur in an article published by Muramoto in December of the same year. The genus name Yezosaurus comes from Yezo, the group containing the Kashima Formation from which the taxa was discovered, and from the Ancient Greek σαῦρος (saûros, "lizard"), all literally meaning "Yezo lizard". The specific epithet mikasaensis is named after the city of Mikasa, a place near the site of discovery. Although these two publications cannot be considered valid from the ICZN rules, Obata and Muramoto were indeed seen as the authors of the original description of Y. mikasaensis. Also in the same year, and those even before the specimen was named, the Japanese Ministry of Education decided to consider the fossil as the country's national treasure.

In 2008, the fossil was completely reidentified by Caldwell and colleagues as a mosasaur, and classified as a new species of Taniwhasaurus, being renamed T. mikasaensis, thus keeping the specific epithet of Obata and Muramoto. In 2019, the phylogenetic revision of tylosaurines conducted by Jimenez and Calwell still considers the specimen to be a representative of the genus Taniwhasaurus, but the assignment to any species remains uncertain, the fossil being insufficient to classify it either in T. mikasaensis or in T oweni. In 2020, 3D scans were performed on replicas of the specimen, with the real fossil requiring special permission from the Japanese Ministry of Education.

Description 
Although the fossils of Taniwhasaurus are incomplete to formally visualize the animal, the rare skeletal elements show that the latter has an anatomy largely characteristic of tylosaurines.

Postcranial skeleton 

The exact number of vertebrae in Taniwhasaurus is unknown, however, the rare fossils concerning this part of the body include the cervical, dorsal, lumbar and caudal vertebrae. As in other tylosaurines, the articular condyles of the cervical vertebrae of Taniwhasaurus are slightly depressed. The neural arch of the atlas has processes that would have ensured the protection of the spinal cord and the fixation of the muscles that hold the head. The neural spine of the axis is stout and elongated, culminating posterodorsally in a broad, flattened, incomplete spike that probably bore a cartilaginous cap. The dorsal vertebrae are proceles, and are characterized to have a greater diameter at the anterior level than posterior. The articular surfaces are placed obliquely posterior to the general axis of the spine. The neural arch is continuous with the anterior parts of the centra, and articulated by bold transverse processes. The condyle of the dorsal vertebrae is broad and circular while the robust parapophysis extends laterally for some distance.

The caudal vertebrae have tall, straight neural spines that lack any processes or zygosphene-zygantrum articulation, a joint found in most squamates. The caudal vertebrae have a small, triangular-shaped neural tube. The centrum is shortened on the rostro-caudal side but is elongated dorso-ventrally and compressed laterally, resulting in a ventrally oval rather than circular condyle as seen in presacral vertebrae. The caudal vertebrae of Taniwhasaurus have craniocaudal centra not fused to the hemal arch, which is a typical case in tylosaurines. Hemal arches articulate with deep hemapophyses but do not fuse with them. Distally, the right and left halves merge midway from the ventral tip of the element, creating a large anterior ridge on the vertebral column.

The ribs of T. oweni are flattened and somewhat dilated at their insertion. The rare preserved ribs show convex articular surfaces and they appear to be articulated on a rough surface, placed on the anterior and superior parts of the vertebral centra. Although the shoulder girdle is incompletely known in Taniwhasaurus, it appears to be broadly similar in morphology to what is found in tylosaurines in general. The coracoid is much larger than the scapula, and both of these bones are convex in shape. The coracoid plate is thin and distal to the coracoid foramen, but there is no presence of emargination on the medial edge. The humerus is very short in relation to its width, being flattened in shape and having a very recurved elbow joint. This same humerus has pronounced muscle ridges. The carp are remarkably flat and slender in shape, their edges being raised and rough. The rare fragments of phalanges indicate that they would have been cylindrical and elongated. This suggests that Taniwhasaurus would have had a muscular and powerful humerus that would have been short and wide, with paddle-shaped bones, indicating that it would have been an efficient swimmer.

Classification 
Taniwhasaurus was always classified within the mosasaurs, but the initial description published by Hector in 1874 does not attribute it to any subtaxa of this family. In 1888, Taniwhasaurus was moved to the genus Platecarpus by Lydekker, considering it a junior synonym. In 1897, Williston named the subfamily Platercarpinae and placed Taniwhasaurus in this group, considering it as a close relative to Platecarpus and Plioplatecarpus. In 1967, paleontologist Dale Russell synonymized Platecarpinae with Plioplatecarpinae due to the principle of priority and their similar taxonomic definitions. It was in 1971 that Taniwhasaurus was moved within the Tylosaurinae by Welles and Gregg, on the basis of cranial characteristics bringing it closer to the genus Tylosaurus. Later discoveries of other tylosaurines, previously mentioned as belonging to distinct genera and which are now considered synonymous to Taniwhasaurus, will confirm Welles and Gregg's proposal on the phylogenetic position of this genus. The members of this subfamily, including the related genus Tylosaurus and possibly Kaikaifilu, are characterized by a conical, elongated rostrum that lacks teeth. In 2019, in their phylogenetic review of this group, Jiménez-Huidobro and Caldwell believe that Taniwhasaurus cannot be considered with certainty to be monophyletic, because some named species have too fragmentary fossils to be assigned concretely to the genus. However, they consider that by ignoring the problematic material, Taniwhasaurus forms a taxon well and truly monophyletic and distinct from Tylosaurus. A study published in 2020 by Daniel Madzia and Andrea Cau suggests a paraphyletic relationship of Tylosaurus, considering that Taniwhasaurus would have evolved from this latter, around 84 million years ago. However, this claim does not appear to be consistent with previous phylogenetic analysis conducted on the two genera.

The following cladogram is modified from the phylogenetic analysis conducted by Jiménez-Huidobro & Caldwell (2019), based on tylosaurine species with materials known enough to model precise relationships:

Paleobiology

Rostral neurovascular system 

A study published in 2020 based on CT scans of the rostrum of the holotype of T. antarcticus reveals the presence of several internal foramina located in the most forward part of the snout. These foramina, the ramus maxillaris and ramus ophthalmicus are abundantly branched and have the particularity of being directly connected to the trigeminal nerve, indicating that they would have sent sensitive information from the skin of the snout to the brain. This means that Taniwhasaurus would have had an electro-sensitive organ capable of detecting the slightest movement of prey underwater. This neurovascular system is comparable to those present in various living and extinct aquatic tetrapods, such as cetaceans, crocodilians, plesiosaurs and ichthyosaurs, which are used to stalk prey in low light conditions.

The study mentions that T. antarcticus is the first mosasaur identified to have such structures that could explain this, but it is likely that this type of organ is present in related genera. Several mosasaurs have large foramina similar to those present in Taniwhasaurus, which seems to indicate a widespread condition within the group. Additionally, tylosaurines appear to display the largest foramen at the snout among mosasaurs. This condition can be correlated with the toothless snout that characterizes the morphology of this subfamily, but further studies are needed to validate these two hypotheses.

Muscularity

Neck mechanics 

The prezygapophyses of T. antarcticus are not as developed, which indicated that this musculature would be less pronounced than in other mosasaurs. The prezygapophyses of the cervical vertebrae mark the location of the longissimus and semispinalis muscles, which partly produce the lateral flexions of the body in reptiles. The little development of crests in the cervical indicates that the gripping surface of the named muscles would consequently be smaller than in other mosasaurs, as well as the force produced by these muscles. T. antarcticus would therefore have had great capacity for lateral movement of the neck, although the muscles anchored there would not have had great strength. Along the same lines, the reduced prezygapophyses indicated that the cervical vertebrae had a looser connection to each other, as they exhibited a reduction in the area of ​​articulation between them. The related genus Tylosaurus would not have had overly pronounced neck mobility due to backward-curving neural spines, which more closely attaches one vertebra to another by means of ligaments and axial musculature. Although vertebrae were not found with complete neural spines in Taniwhasaurus, centra compression values ​​indicate that although it may have had some restriction to lateral movement, it would have been more pronounced anyway.

Mobility 

The analysis of the dorsal and caudal vertebrae is complex due to the poor preservation of the fossil material of Taniwhasaurus, which does not preserve the transverse processes nor the neural spines. Several anatomical reviews performed using the caudal vertebrae place great emphasis on the neural and hemale spines, conclusions that cannot easily be applied to Taniwhasaurus. The caudal vertebrae of T. antarcticus follow a pattern very similar to that found in both Plotosaurus and Tylosaurus, where vertebral sturdiness is taken as a parameter to quantify vertebral stiffness in different areas. Some of the caudal regions can be distinguished, as is the case of the pygal vertebrae. These are interpreted as a support zone that would have great flexibility. This part of the caudal vertebrae consists of a very similar in morphology to each other, and is represented in Taniwhasaurus only by intermediate caudal vertebrae.

The terminal caudal vertebrae would support the caudal fin and, as in Plotosaurus, these have a subcircular section in the anterior region and turn into an ovoid shape compressed laterally posteriorly. However, this configuration does not allow one to assess whether or not there is a tendency for high numbers of pygal vertebrae at the expense of intermediate caudals, as seen in derived mosasaurines. It was suggested that Rusellosaurina, the clade including tylosaurines and related lineages, had a plesiomorphic axial skeleton and that therefore their swimming would be less developed, quite the opposite of mosasaurines, which would have had carangiform swimming, that is to say forms where the tail is the main source of propulsion, while the most anterior part of the body maintains restricted movement. However, a thesis published in 2017 proves that Tylosaurus had a powerful and fast swim, due in particular to the regionalization of the caudal vertebrae, although less marked than in more derived mosasaurines.

The analyzes concerning the dorsal and caudal vertebrae in Plotosaurus and Tylosaurus are similar to those found in modern cetaceans, and that therefore these would also have a carangiform swimming shape. The relative measurements of the vertebral centra, of the morphological and phylogenetic proximity with Tylosaurus, seem to indicate that the tail of T. antarcticus would also have a very important role in movement, confirming this hypothesis. However, the cervical vertebrae of Taniwhasaurus show an unusual range of motion in a carangiform swimmer, perhaps wider than in any other mosasaur due to the lateral compression of the vertebral centra in this area, but also at their length. Based on this evidence, it is accepted that although the entire vertebral column of T. antarcticus would have had great mobility, the tail would be the main source of propulsion, supporting the trend towards more carangiform forms, placing Taniwhasaurus somewhere between the forms eel-shaped basals and carangiform-derived forms. This is in agreement with the phylogenetic position of this taxon.

Paleoecology 
[[File:Taniwhasaurus repartition.png|thumb|upright=1.22|Geographical distribution of Taniwhasaurus|alt=Map showing the various localities from which the different species of Taniwhasaurus were listed: in black, Taniwhasaurus oweni; in red, Taniwhasaurus antarcticus; in green Taniwhasaurus capensis; in yellow Taniwhasaurus mikasaensis]]

The fossil record shows that Taniwhasaurus had a mostly widespread distribution in what was once Gondwana, its fossils having been found in marine deposits relating to parts of the ancient supercontinent. Although T. mikasaensis was found in Japan, the two currently valid species T. antarcticus and T. oweni would probably have been endemic to Gondwana.

 New Zealand T. oweni is known from the Conway Formation, and more specifically from Haumuri Bluff, a locality containing Lower and Middle Campanian fossils. The specific part of the site reaches a maximum thickness of 240 m and lithologically the unit is a loosely cemented massive gray siltstone with locally limited interbeds of fine sandstone. The cores of the concretions present in the formation appear to be fossilized bones, shells or even wood, indicating that the environment of deposit would have been the lower zone of a foreshore. Relatively few large vertebrates are known within the site from sources, the only clearly identified being the great rajiform ray Australopristis.

 Antarctic T. antarcticus is known from Late Campanian deposits of the Antarctic Peninsula, in the Snow Hill Island Formation, located on James Ross Island. The taxon is known primarily from Member Gamma, a highly diverse site containing numerous fossils of marine and terrestrial faunas. This place consists of about 200 m of sandstone and coquina inside the plateau, dominated mainly by molluscs of the group of bivalves and gastropods. The sandstones are mostly fine-grained, well-sorted, forming massive beds or bedded in parallel, with occasional bedding of waves and current ripples. Several bony fishes are present, including ichthyodectiforms, aulopiforms, albuliforms, as well as an indeterminate teleost. Cartilaginous fishes are mainly represented by holocephalians and sharks. Holocephalians include chimaerids, callorhinchids, rhinochimaerids as well as the massive species Edaphodon snowhillensis, which is one of the largest chimeriforms identified to date. Sharks present in the area include hexanchiforms, lamniforms, squatiniforms, squaliforms and synechodontiforms. Several marine reptiles are known from this locality, but mosasaurs do not appear to be as diverse as in other nearby geological formations in Antarctica. The only ones clearly identified within member Gamma are T. antarcticus as well as an undetermined species of the genus Hainosaurus. The only known plesiosaurs from the Gamma Member are uncertain either belonging to the elasmosaurids or are considered indeterminate. Dinosaurs are also listed in this formation, including the ankylosaur Antarctopelta, the ornithopod Trinisaura and an unnamed lithostrotian sauropod, the latter being the first known sauropod from Antarctica.

 See also 

 Tylosaurus Kaikaifilu''

Notes

References

Mosasaurids
Extinct reptiles of New Zealand
Fossil taxa described in 1874
Fossil taxa described in 2002
Fossil taxa described in 2008
James Ross Island
Prehistoric reptiles of Antarctica
Fossils of Japan
Mosasaurs of Asia
Mosasaurs of Oceania